Robert Mossom may refer to:

 Robert Mossom (bishop) (1617–1679), bishop of Derry
 Robert Mossom (priest), his grandson, professor of divinity at Trinity College and dean of Ossory